The Slatina is a river in Slovakia. Its source is located in the mountain range Poľana, its mouth in Zvolen. It is a left tributary of the Hron.

References

Rivers of Slovakia